Bəbəli (also, Babali, Bebeli, and Babaly) is a village in the Khachmaz District of Azerbaijan. The village forms part of the municipality of Khaspoladoba.

References 

Populated places in Khachmaz District